Béboro is a sub-prefecture of Mandoul Region in Chad.

References 

Populated places in Chad